If It Was You is the third studio album by Canadian indie pop duo Tegan and Sara, released on August 20, 2002. Officially, it is their second release through Vapor Records, though they independently released Under Feet Like Ours in 1999.

If It Was You was recorded on Galiano Island and the Factory Studio, with the exception of the track "And Darling (This Thing That Breaks My Heart)", which was recorded at Tegan's house.

An enhanced version of If It Was You was released on June 3, 2003. This version includes one bonus track ("Come On Kids"), two music videos ("Monday Monday Monday" and "I Hear Noises"), and two tour videos ("Born in the Eighties Tour" and "The Never-Ending Tour").

The singles released from this album include "Time Running", "I Hear Noises", and "Monday Monday Monday". A video of "Living Room" was directed by Kaare Andrews.

Track listing

Personnel
 Tegan Quin – main performer, photography
 Sara Quin – main performer, album design and layout
 Gabe Cipes – bass guitar
 Rob Chursinoff – drums, percussion
 David Carswell – multi instruments, producer, mixing, engineer
 Michael Ledwidge – organ, keyboards, slide guitar
 Ezra Cipes – banjo
 Sheldon Zaharko – engineer
 Pascal Leclair – assistant engineer
 Steve Hall – mastering
 John Collins – multi instruments, mixing, producer, engineer
 Melanie – photography
 Demoe – album design and layout
 Kaare Andrews – cover photography and original ideas

Song placement and cover versions

 "Time Running" would later be featured during a chase sequence of an episode from What's New Scooby Doo?.
 In 2004, Matt Sharp and Maya Rudolph of The Rentals recorded a cover version of Tegan and Sara's song "Not Tonight" and released it for free on the Internet.

Notes
1.The titles of the songs "And Darling (This Thing That Breaks My Heart)" and "Don't Confess" are often mixed up, in that the parenthesis stands next to "Don't Confess" instead of "And Darling". This can most likely be traced back to the track listing on the back of the CD, where the parenthesis is located under "And Darling", but next to "Don't Confess" (presumably for lack of space). The line "this thing that breaks my heart" can be found in the lyrics to "And Darling", however.

References

External links
 Album info at fansite

2002 albums
Tegan and Sara albums
Sanctuary Records albums
Vapor Records albums
Albums produced by John Collins (Canadian musician)
Albums produced by David Carswell